Joakim Karl-Olof Flyg (born October 16, 1990) is a Swedish curler.

He is a 2017 Swedish men's champion and a two-time Swedish mixed champion (2015, 2016).

Teams

Men's

Mixed

Personal life
His sister is Swedish curler and coach Zandra Flyg. They played together at the 2015 World Mixed Curling Championship.

References

External links
 
 

Living people
1990 births
Swedish male curlers
Swedish curling champions